Barbary Coast Gent is a 1944 American Western comedy film set in 1880s San Francisco's Barbary Coast and Nevada starring Wallace Beery. The movie was directed by Roy Del Ruth and features Binnie Barnes, Beery's brother Noah Beery, Sr., John Carradine, and Chill Wills. It is also known as Gold Town, Honest Plush Brannon and The Honest Thief.

Plot
Honest Plush Brannon (Wallace Beery) is a confidence man from the Barbary Coast in San Francisco. He is engaged to Li'l Damish (Binnie Barnes) who is a saloon owner. Plush is in need of money to prove he can stand on his own. His plan to come by some money is disturbed by his ex-companion, Duke Cleat (John Carradine), who accuses Plush of doing him wrong in the past. After a quick showdown, Plush manages to shoot and wound Duke badly. Because of this, Plush is forced to leave town, and decides to take the train to Denver to find his luck. Aboard the train he meets an industrial railroad Millionaire, Bradford Bellamy I (Donald Meek) and convinces him he is about to serve the man in a blackmailing process. Bellamy I wants to throw Plush off the train, but instead they make a deal, that Plush will hold a speech in Bellamy I's name in Gold Town. Plush pretends to be Bellamy I's financial voice and is greeted as such in Gold Town. Even his old partner with whom he used to rob stage coaches, Johnny Adair (Ray Collins), believes him. Johnny's daughter, Portia (Frances Rafferty) is engaged to Bellamy I's grandson, Bradford Bellamy III (Bruce Kellogg). When Plush is attending a ceremony and is about to dedicate a cornerstone in the city, he accidentally discovers that the stone has gold in it. Plush prevents an article declaring that Bellamy III is engaging another woman, an Eastern debutante, to reach the press, and since Bellamy III have no intentions of engaging anyone but Portia, he is grateful to Plush. When the gold finding in the cornerstone is confirmed, Plush clais the ground where the stone is, and everyone in Gold Town wants to invest in his newly founded gold-mining company. Back in San Francisco, Duke has recovered from his injuries and seeks revenge. He finds out about Plush's luck, and at gun-point he forces Plush to give all his earnings to him. Broke and homeless, Plush is forced to rob a Wells Fargo payroll stagecoach. He leaves a poem at the crime scene, and after a few more robberies, he is known as the outlaw "Jingle Bill". The only stage coach that never gets robbed is the one Johnny drives. Plush uses his booty to start up the mining for gold in his company, and soon enough he strikes gold. In an attempt to catch the robber, Plush is forced to stage a robbery against Johnny's coach, in which Plush participates. Plush is shot and wounded by Johnny. Meanwhile, Li'l has come to Gold Town to warn Plush that Duke has been at her place, stolen a bunch of Plush's poems, and is headed to Gold Town. After the fake robbery, suspicion falls on Plush to be the robber. When Duke confronts Plush in the street, the two men once again have a showdown, ultimately shooting each other. Duke dies from his wounds, and the stolen poems are found on his body. Duke is taken for Jingle Bill, but Plush steps up and confesses he is the robber. He waves goodbye to Li'l, Bellamy III and Portia, as he is off to serve a one-year sentence in prison.

Cast
Wallace Beery as Honest Plush Brannon
Binnie Barnes as Li'l Damish
John Carradine as Duke Cleat
Bruce Kellogg as Bradford Bellamy III
Frances Rafferty as Portia Adair
Chill Wills as Sheriff Hightower
Noah Beery, Sr. as Pete Hanibal
Henry O'Neill as Colonel Watrous
Ray Collins as Johnny Adair
Morris Ankrum as Alec Veeder
Donald Meek as Bradford Bellamy I

See also
List of Western films of the 1940s

References

External links
 
 

1944 films
American black-and-white films
1940s English-language films
Films directed by Roy Del Ruth
American Western (genre) comedy films
1940s Western (genre) comedy films
Metro-Goldwyn-Mayer films
Films set in San Francisco
Barbary Coast, San Francisco
Films set in the 1880s
1940s historical comedy films
American historical comedy films
1940s American films